Adalgiso Ferraris (16 February 1890 – 31 December 1968) was an Italian-born British composer and pianist. Ferraris' arrangements and compositions were based on classical and popular genres, with a particular flavour of gypsy, Hungarian and Russian traditionals. Among his best known songs are the romantic Russian song "Dark Eyes", "Calinerie", "Souvenir d'Ukraine", "the Russian Pedlar", "Two guitars"  and "A Balalaika"

Biography

Early life
Ferraris was born in Novara, Piedmont, Italy. He went on to study at the Regia Accademia Filarmonica in Bologna, and studied piano and music composition with Manfredi and Crescentino.

Russian experience
In 1910 Ferraris travelled to Russia to study with Tchevnioroshy in St. Petersburg. Here he supported his studies playing during the capital's last years of the "belle Epoque" nightlife.

He developed his skills particularly in the piccolo concerto and especially in Tzigane music. In 1912 he became pianist in an orchestra which also played at Tsarskoye Selo.

One of his most famous song is the Russian styled "Dark Eyes",  published around 1910 as Schwarze Augen with German editor Otto Kuhl. Ferraris then published it again in 1931 by Paris Editions Salabert, as "Tes yeux noirs (impression russe) " and with Jacques Liber, on Oct 9th, 1931, as "Dark Eyes".
The song was a success of the 1930s, with artists such as Albert Sandler, filmed by British Pathe in 1932   and Leslie Jeffries, filmed by British Pathe in 1939   or sung by Al Bowlly, with words of Albert Mellor.
Ferraris himself can be seen in a British Pathé film from 1934 of Alfredo and his Gypsy band, sitting in the orchestra behind the lead Alfredo. They sometimes played together, as showed in this picture below at the Alexandria Palace in London.

Among other versions, a 1941 recording of Dark Eyes (by Ferraris) played by Harry Parry and his radio sextet was a hit during the war, and a  very original interpretation for electric guitar, played by Chet Atkins. Ferraris version is still played today by many artists such as the Trio Artemis  and Hristo Kardjiev.  The song was recorded in Italy by Nino Impallomeni and his orchestra, and by Don Rico and his Orchestra.

The Great War
Ferraris was caught by the war in Russia, and travelled via Finland through England to get back to Italy and join the Italian Army.

Success in England
After the first War and his marriage in 1920 with Adele Brunelli, Ferraris went to London, where he played with his band, the Novarese Band, and composed and published many well known songs.

In London, Ferraris played in the Piccadilly Orchestra and other London orchestras and became acquainted with many musicians of that era who played his music, including violinists Al Bowlly, Albert Sandler and Leslie Jeffries. His collaboration with Max Jaffa was also very prolific, with many of Ferraris songs recorded by Jaffa, such as, again,  Dark Eyes, "Souvenir d'Ukraine", Gipsy Idylle, and other songs., as shown in the Vocalion Broadcast of November 1932.

In 1932 Ferraris wrote "The Russian Pedlar", which became one of his major successes, played by bands such as The Commodore Grand Orchestra.

In 1936 Mantovani and his band brings to success "A Balalaika" a tango.

Another 1930s famous song of Ferraris is the orchestral and piano arrangements for Two Guitars, which is still a hit for touring bands, including the 100 Tagu Ciganyzenekar and the Gypsy Philharmonic Orchestra and others like Zoltan Maga.

In the late thirties, the Italian singer Dora Menichelli with the famous duo Bormioli-Semprini record, with Parlophon, a few Ferraris songs in Italian, including "la canzone che nome non ha" or the song without a name, currently preserved at the National Museum of audio, Museo dell'Audiovisivo.

Here is a list of some of his less known songs:
- Flor Gitana

- For you my love I'm waiting

- Idylle Tzigane

- In a gipsy camp

- Rose of Spain

- Midnight follies

- Life is Beautiful (La vita e' bella)

- A fete in Santa Lucia, part of the suite "bella Napoli", and also played by Mantovani and his Orchestra
- Galanteria

Late years
At the outbreak of War War II, he went back to Italy as an Italian citizen and stayed until the end of the war. He then came back to England, becoming naturalised British. In the difficult times of post-war London he restarted his musical career and also formed a music publishing company.

He continued to live in London, composing and playing music on his beloved antique "Pleyel", until his death on the last day of 1968, at his house in Woolwich.

References

1890 births
1968 deaths
20th-century Italian composers
Italian expatriates in the Russian Empire
Italian emigrants to the United Kingdom
Italian male composers
Light music composers
People from Novara
20th-century Italian male musicians